The 18th World Team Challenge 2019 (officially: Joka Classic Biathlon World Team Challenge auf Schalke 2019) was a biathlon competition, that was held at December 28, 2019, at the Veltins-Arena in Gelsenkirchen, Germany.

Format of competition
The competition was held in two stages: mass start and pursuit.

Participants
20 sportsmen (10 male, 10 female) competed as mixed teams. 9 different countries were represented at this event.

Results

Mass start
Results and video are available here.

Pursuit
Results, video and photos are available here.

External links
 Official Webpage of the Event

World Team Challenge
2019 in biathlon
2019 in German sport